Jessamyn Waldman Rodriguez  is a Canadian-American social entrepreneur. She is the founder and served as the Chief Executive Officer of Hot Bread Kitchen, a non-profit in New York City, that trains women of color and immigrant women in culinary and professional skills. Rodriguez was named to Fortune magazine's 2015 list of the 20 Most Innovative Women in Food and Drink. She is the author of The Hot Bread Kitchen Cookbook: Artisanal Baking from Around the World, a bread-making book for home bakers.

Early life and education
Jessamyn Waldman was born to a Jewish family in Kingston, Ontario, Canada, and was raised in Toronto. Both of her parents were teachers. Her great-grandfather, an immigrant from Russia, was the owner of Perlmutter's Bakery in Toronto. She enjoyed braiding challah with her mother. Her father died when she was 12.

While studying at the University of British Columbia (UBC), she spent a year abroad in Santiago, Chile, and also was a teacher of human rights and health education near Guatemala City for a period of four months. She graduated from UBC with a B.A. in Latin American Studies and Fine Arts. She pursued her graduate degree in public administration at Columbia University, specializing in immigration policy and human rights, earning her degree in 2004. Concurrent with her degree program, she contracted as a researcher in the Population Division of the United Nations Department of Economic and Social Affairs, and worked for a year as the Youth Landmine Ambassador in Toronto for the Canadian Department of Foreign Affairs. She went on to work in the areas of public policy, immigration policy, and human rights for the United Nations and NGOs, including work as a consultant at the United Nations Development Programme in Costa Rica. She also interned at Greyston Bakery in Yonkers, New York, which bases its operating model on social justice.

Following her public policy career, she began teaching at a bilingual (Spanish/English) elementary school in Sunset Park, Brooklyn. In 2005 she was appointed director of human rights programming for the School for Human Rights in Brooklyn.

She had the idea of starting a social enterprise based on bread-making around 2000. In 2006 she enrolled at The New School, where she earned her Master Baker Certificate. She then apprenticed in the bread kitchen of Daniel, a restaurant owned and operated by French celebrity chef Daniel Boulud. She was the first female baker hired by the restaurant, where she worked for two years.

Hot Bread Kitchen

In 2007 she founded Hot Bread Kitchen, a non-profit social enterprise to teach bread-making and employment skills to low-income minority women and immigrants. Started in her own home kitchen, the operation moved into part-time rented kitchen space in the Long Island Artisan Baking Center and in 2010 into the city-owned La Marqueta market in East Harlem. The project trains women for professional careers baking many types of breads – including Moroccan msemen, Persian nan-e barbari, and Jewish challah – which were sold in retail outlets and online. 

The 100-hour culinary training course includes classes in "English, kitchen math, bakery science, professional skills, and management". All graduates are placed with culinary employment partners. Trainees are referred by community partners, and they often refer their own relatives to the program. As of 2019, Hot Bread Kitchen has graduated 162 women from 60 countries. Graduates earn an average of 70% more than they did before entering the program.

In 2010 Hot Bread Kitchen opened HBK Incubates, a small-business incubator that assists entrepreneurs in opening culinary businesses. 

In 2015 Rodriguez published The Hot Bread Kitchen Cookbook, a bread-making book for home bakers, featuring recipes made at the bakery, bread-making tips, and stories and photographs of the women at work. There are also recipes for main dishes and a chapter on re-purposing leftovers.

In 2018, Jessamyn stepped away from Hot Bread Kitchen and became the Managing Director at Union Square Hospitality Group's Daily Provisions.

Honors and awards
In 2013 Rodriguez was the recipient of the Global Citizen Award from the Clinton Global Initiative. In 2014 she was named to Crain's New York's "40 Under 40" list and received the Celebrating Women Award from the New York Women's Foundation. In 2015 she placed 18th on Fortune magazine's list of the 20 Most Innovative Women in Food and Drink.

In 2008 she became a fellow of Echoing Green.

Personal life
She and her husband, Eli Rodriguez, have two children. 

Jessamyn sits on advisory boards for the James Beard Foundation, WENYC, and the New York Federal Reserve Bank.

Bibliography
 (with Julia Turshen)

References

Sources

External links

"How to Make a Mean Onion Bialy" by Jessamyn Waldman Rodriguez
"Women Taking Over the Food World" in Rachael Ray Every Day Magazine

Living people
American women chief executives
Bakers
Canadian Jews
American Jews
People from Kingston, Ontario
Businesspeople from Toronto
People from Brooklyn
University of British Columbia alumni
School of International and Public Affairs, Columbia University alumni
21st-century American women
Year of birth missing (living people)